Leptagrostis is a genus of bunchgrasses in the tribe Molinieae of the grass family, Poaceae, native to eastern Africa.

The only known species is Leptagrostis schimperiana. It is endemic to Ethiopia.

References

Molinieae
Grasses of Africa
Endemic flora of Ethiopia
Monotypic Poaceae genera